Bergkamen Power Station is a coal-fired power station in Germany. It is located in the city of Bergkamen, in the Unna district. It was established in 1981 and has an output capacity of 747 megawatts. The power station produces 4.8 billion kWh of electricity annually, and also provides long-distance heating through steam generation.

Annual hard coal consumption amounts to about 1.4 million tons. In October 2021, the station stopped temporarily due to a coal shortage. The power station is operated by Evonik Industries.

References

Sources
 STEAG.com: Kraftwerk Bergkamen 
 route-industriekultur.ruhr: Bergkamen 

Coal-fired power stations in Germany
Buildings and structures in Unna (district)
Energy infrastructure completed in 1981
Economy of North Rhine-Westphalia